Mohammad Barkatullah (2 March 1898 – 2 November 1974) was a Bangladeshi writer. Barkatullah was born at village Ghorashal under Shahjadpur which was belong to Pabna district at that time.

Life
Barkatullah was a deputy secretary of education department of East Pakistan, later Bangladesh.

Writing career
In Parasya Pratibha (The Talents of Persia), he praised the thinking of the Mutazilites in the eighth century, and described the literary, philosophical, and scientific advancements made possible over the succeeding four centuries by their independent spirit. Barkatullah's literary works were included in the curriculum of school level, secondary, higher secondary and graduation level Bengali Literature in Bangladesh.

Books
 Parasya Pratibha (The Talents of Persia) (1924 and 1932)
 Manuser Dharma (1934)
 Karbala O Imam Bangser Itihas (1957)
 Nabigrha Sangbad, Makka Khanda (1960)
 Naya Jatir Srasta Hazrat Muhammad (1963)
 Hazrat Osman (1968)
 Bangla Sahitye Muslim Dhara (1969)

Awards
 Bangla Academy Literary Award (1960)
 Daud Prize (1960) 
 Sitara-i-Imtiaz (1962)
 President's Award (1970)

References

Golpo Songroho (Collected Stories), the national textbook of B.A. (pass and subsidiary) course of Bangladesh, published by University of Dhaka in 1979 (reprint in 1986).
Bangla Sahitya (Bengali Literature), the national textbook of intermediate (college) level of Bangladesh published in 1996 by all educational boards.

1898 births
1974 deaths
Bengali writers
Bengali-language writers
Bangladeshi non-fiction writers
Recipients of Bangla Academy Award
Recipients of Sitara-i-Imtiaz
20th-century non-fiction writers

People from Pabna District